These Things Happen may refer to:

These Things Happen (G-Eazy album)
These Things Happen (David Van Tieghem album)